Big Creek is a stream in northern Ralls County in the U.S. state of Missouri. It is a tributary of the Salt River.

Big Creek was so named on account of its size.

See also
List of rivers of Missouri

References

Rivers of Ralls County, Missouri
Rivers of Missouri